M. A. Thirumugam (died 2004) was an Indian film director and editor. He was the younger brother of the film producer Sandow M. M. A. Chinnappa Thevar.

Career
He started his film career as an editor and then worked as director for more than 35 films in Tamil and Hindi. He worked mainly on films produced by his elder brother beginning with Thaikkupin Tharam in 1956.

Filmography

As editor
 Kaithi (1951)
 Marmayogi (1951)
 Rani (1952)
 Edhir Paradhathu (1954)
 Manohara (film) (1954)
 Vettaikaran (1964)
 Haathi Mere Saathi (1971)
 Maa (1976)

As director
 Thaikkupin Tharam (1956)
 Neelamalai Thirudan (1957)
 Pillai Kaniyamudhu (1958)
 Uzhavukkum Thozhilukkum Vandhanai Seivom (1959)
 Vaazha Vaitha Deivam (1959)
 Uthami Petra Rathinam (1960)
 Yanai Paagan (1960)
 Kongunattu Thangam (1961)
 Thaai Sollai Thattadhe (1961)
 Kudumba Thalaivan (1962)
 Thayai Katha Thanayan (1962)
 Dharmam Thalai Kaakkum (1963)
 Needhikkuppin Paasam (1963)
 Vettaikaran (1964)
 Thozhilali (1964)
 Kanni Thaai (1965)
 Kaattu Rani (1965)
 Thaayum Magalum (1965)
 Mugaraasi (1966)
 Thanipiravi (1966)
 Magaraasi (1967)
 Thaikku Thalaimagan (1967)
 Vivasayee (1967)
 Thear Thiruvizha (1968)
 
 Kadhal Vaaganam (1968)
 Akka Thangai (1969)
 Thunaivan (1969)
 Penn Deivam (1970)
 Maanavan (1970)
 Haathi Mere Saathi (1971)*
 Nalla Neram (1972)
 Dheivam (1972)
 Komatha En Kulamatha (1973)
 Gaai Aur Gori (1973)*
 Maa (1976)*
 Dharma Raja (1980)
 Ellam Un Kairasi (1980)
 Nadhi Ondru Karai Moondru (1981)

Those marked * are Hindi films, others Tamil.

References

Bibliography

External links

Hindi film editors
Tamil film editors
Film directors from Tamil Nadu
Tamil film directors
People from Coimbatore
20th-century Indian film directors
Film editors from Tamil Nadu
2004 deaths